Ricky Martin discography may refer to:

 Ricky Martin albums discography
 Ricky Martin singles discography

Ricky Martin